Acacia eremaea is a shrub or tree of the genus Acacia and the subgenus Plurinerves that is endemic to an area in western Australia.

Description
Like most species of Acacia it has phyllodes rather than true leaves. The erect, evergreen phyllodes have an elliptic-lanceolate to narrowly elliptic shape and are straight to shallowly incurved. It blooms from July to October and produces yellow flowers. The simple inflorescences occur in groups of two to four in the axils and have spherical flower-heads with a diameter to  containing 54 to 85 densely packed golden coloured flowers. The chartaceous, straight to slightly curved seed pods that form after flowering have a linear shape and are strongly raised over each of the seeds.

Taxonomy
The species was first formally described by the botanist Cecil Rollo Payton Andrews in 1904 as part of the work Additions to the West Australian Flora as published in the Journal of the West Australian Natural History Society. It was reclassified as Racosperma eremaeum in 2003 by Leslie Pedley then returned to genus Acacia in 2006.

Distribution
It is native to an area in the Mid West and Wheatbelt regions of Western Australia and is commonly situated on saline depressions, stony clay flats and around salt lakes growing in clay, clay-loam and sandy soils. The range of the plant extends from around Boolardy Station and Cue in the north down to around Wongan Hills in the south where it is found in low woodland and tall shrubland usually dominated by other species of Acacia.

See also
 List of Acacia species

References

eremaea
Acacias of Western Australia
Taxa named by Cecil Rollo Payton Andrews
Plants described in 1904